Glines Canyon Dam, also known as Upper Elwha Dam, built in 1927, was a  high concrete arch dam built on the Elwha River within Olympic National Park, Clallam County, Washington.

It impounded Lake Mills reservoir. The dam was demolished in 2014 as part of the Elwha River ecosystem restoration project; as of 2015 it is the tallest dam ever to be intentionally breached. The Glines Canyon Dam was the largest dam removal ever.

History
The dam was built privately to generate electricity for industries and major military installations on the Olympic Peninsula, including lumber and paper mills in Port Angeles.

The Glines Canyon Hydroelectric Power Plant historic district, a  area comprising the dam, the powerhouse, and the water conveying system, was listed on the National Register of Historic Places in 1988.

Effects of dam on river habitat and area ecology
By the early 21st-century, fewer than 4,000 adult salmon returned each year.

Habitat restoration

Numerous groups lobbied Congress to remove the two dams on the river and restore the habitat of the river and its valley. The Elwha River Ecosystem and Fisheries Restoration Act of 1992 authorized the US Federal Government to acquire the Elwha Dam and Glines Canyon Dam hydroelectric power projects for decommissioning and demolition for habitat restoration.

The Elwha Ecosystem Restoration project started in September 2011 as work to demolish the nearby Elwha Dam began downstream. The final piece of the Glines Canyon Dam was removed August 26, 2014. Now that the dam has been removed, the area that was under Lake Mills is being revegetated and its banks secured to prevent erosion and to speed up ecological restoration.

Gallery

See also

Elwha Dam

References

Sources
 Grossman, Elizabeth (2002). Watershed: The Undamming of America, Basic Books, .
 Mapes, Lynda V. (2016). "Elway: Roaring Back to Life," The Seattle Times. http://projects.seattletimes.com/2016/elwha/

External links

Glines Canyon Dam Removal Process - animation
Glines Canyon Dam webcam and time lapse movie of removal project
"Demolition dam: Why dismantle a huge river barrier?", BBC video
Elwha River Restoration, National Park Service

Former dams
Dams in Washington (state)
Demolished buildings and structures in Washington (state)
Demolished power stations in the United States
National Register of Historic Places in Olympic National Park
Buildings and structures in Clallam County, Washington
Hydroelectric power plants in Washington (state)
Dams on the National Register of Historic Places in Washington (state)
Dams completed in 1927
Energy infrastructure completed in 1927
Buildings and structures demolished in 2014
Historic American Engineering Record in Washington (state)
Historic districts on the National Register of Historic Places in Washington (state)
National Register of Historic Places in Clallam County, Washington
2014 disestablishments in Washington (state)
1927 establishments in Washington (state)
Former power stations in Washington (state)